The 1920 Akron football team represented the University of Akron in the 1920 college football season. The team was led by sixth-year head coach Fred Sefton. Akron outscored their opponents by a total of 99–93.

Schedule

References

Akron
Akron Zips football seasons
Akron football